Spencer High School may refer to:

William H. Spencer High School — Columbus, Georgia
Spencer High School (Iowa) — Spencer, Iowa
Spencer High School (Wisconsin) — Spencer, Wisconsin
Spencer County High School — Taylorsville, Kentucky
South Spencer High School — Rockport, Indiana
Spencer/Naper High School — Spencer, Nebraska
Star Spencer High School — Spencer, Oklahoma
Spencer-Van Etten High School — Spencer, New York